Sue Bierman Park, also known as Ferry Park, is a park in San Francisco, California in the Financial District. Sue Bierman Park replaced off-ramps just north of the Embarcadero Center, and next to the park Ferry Plaza was constructed in front of the San Francisco Ferry Building, which itself was remodeled into an upscale gourmet marketplace in 2003. The park is named after Sue Bierman, a San Francisco civic activist and Supervisor.

References

Parks in San Francisco